William Dichtel (born 1978, Houston, Texas) is the Robert L. Letsinger Professor of Chemistry at Northwestern University and a 2015 MacArthur Fellow who has helped pioneer the development of porous polymers known as covalent organic frameworks. Dichtel was awarded a Guggenheim Fellowship in 2018. In 2020, Dichtel was selected as the 2020 Laureate in Chemistry of the Blavatnik Awards for Young Scientists. He also founded Cylopure, a university spin-off that seeks to bring to market water filtration with cyclodextrin polymers.

Early life and education 
Dichtel was born in 1978 in Houston, Texas. He was raised in Roanoke, Virginia. Dichtel earned his B.S. from the Massachusetts Institute of Technology in 2000, where he worked in the laboratory of Prof. Timothy M. Swager. He then moved to the University of California at Berkeley to perform graduate studies in the laboratory of Prof. Jean M. J. Fréchet. In Fréchet's lab, Dichtel synthesized porphyrin-containing dendrimers for light harvesting applications. He then moved to Los Angeles to perform joint postdoctoral research between 2005 and 2008 with Prof. Fraser Stoddart at UCLA, and Prof. James R. Heath at Caltech, where he studied rotaxanes.

Independent career 
Dichtel began his independent career at Cornell University in 2008, as an Assistant Professor in the Department of Chemistry and Chemical Biology. He was promoted to Associate Professor in 2014. Dichtel moved to Northwestern University in 2016, where he holds the post of Robert L. Letsinger Professor of Chemistry.

References

Living people
Cornell University faculty
MacArthur Fellows
21st-century American chemists
1978 births
Massachusetts Institute of Technology alumni
Northwestern University faculty
University of California, Berkeley alumni
University of California, Los Angeles alumni
California Institute of Technology alumni